Playing God is a 1997 American dramatic crime thriller film directed by Andy Wilson and written by Mark Haskell Smith. It stars David Duchovny (in his first starring role after achieving success with The X-Files), Timothy Hutton, and Angelina Jolie.

Plot
Duchovny plays Eugene Sands, a surgeon who has his medical license revoked after operating under the influence of amphetamines and opiates. Hutton's character, a crime lord named Raymond Blossom, happens upon him in a bar where Sands saves someone's life with an emergency procedure to inflate a collapsed lung. Blossom hires Sands as his personal physician, patching up his accomplices when they cannot go to a hospital, and tending to the crime boss and his girlfriend, Claire (Jolie). In the final act of the film, Claire and Sands become involved, and he must face up to conflicting loyalties to Blossom, Claire, and the FBI agent who has blackmailed him into being an informant.

Cast
 David Duchovny as Dr. Eugene Sands
 Timothy Hutton as Raymond Blossom
 Angelina Jolie as Claire
 Michael Massee as Gage
 Peter Stormare as Vladimir
 Andrew Tiernan as Cyril
 Gary Dourdan as Yates
 John Hawkes as Flick
 Will Stewart as Perry
 Philip Moon as Casey
Pavel D. Lynchnikoff as Andrei
 Tracey Walter as Jim
 Sandra Kinder as Sue
 Bill Rosier as Jerry
 Keone Young as Mr. Ksi
 Stella Garcia as South African Businesswoman

Production
Its release was delayed due to initial negative reactions from test audiences. The film's trailer contained a brief glimpse of a sex scene between Duchovny and Jolie. The actress later confirmed that she had filmed two sex scenes for the movie, but that both of them were edited out of the final cut.

Reception
The film did not fare well financially or with critics, scoring just a 16% at the review site Rotten Tomatoes and making only $4,166,918 at the US theater box office. Popular film critic Roger Ebert however, gave the film three stars, saying "This may not be a great movie, but for both Duchovny and Hutton, it's a turning point", citing Duchovny's ability to "stand above the action" like Clint Eastwood; and Hutton's ability to create a real character as the villain, instead of merely filling a space.

In an interview with the New York Times dated 9 April 2000 David Duchovny himself, while talking about production difficulties, stated that “‘Playing God' was a mistake only because we didn't have a script ready... I should have just bailed out, but I didn't know."

Music
The song "Spybreak!" by Propellerheads was used in this film two years before its stardom debut as the main song of the cult movie The Matrix (1999).

References

External links
 
 

1997 films
1990s crime drama films
1997 crime thriller films
1990s psychological thriller films
American crime drama films
American crime thriller films
Films about drugs
Touchstone Pictures films
Films produced by Marc Abraham
Beacon Pictures films
1997 drama films
1990s English-language films
1990s American films